Cecilie Uttrup Ludwig (born 23 August 1995) is a Danish professional road cyclist, who currently rides for UCI Women's WorldTeam .

Career

As a junior, she competed at the 2012 UCI Road World Championships and the 2013 UCI Road World Championships.

In the 2018 La Course by Le Tour de France she finished in 4th place, with her teammate Ashleigh Moolman taking the final podium place. She also took the mountains classification in this race. After this race she gave her first of what would become several excitable interviews, with this one including advice for any cyclist who has bad legs to have their wisdom teeth removed. At the very end she said was so excited for chocolate and champagne and pizza and vacation. Over the next few years her results in France would only get better. The next year she claimed the final podium place, in 2021 she placed 2nd, and in 2022 she won a stage.

She finished on the podium in 3rd in the 2019 Tour of Flanders. Her post race interview went viral as a result of her excited and comical demeanor giving a vivid description of the passionate fans and the sprint finish as the peloton was closing in on her group of surviving breakaway riders. Near the end of the interview she described herself as a dead fish, but a happy dead fish.

She finished in fourth place in the 2020 Giro Rosa, and won the green jersey as winner of the mountains classification.

In July 2022, she was named as one of the pre-race favourites for the first edition of the Tour de France Femmes. She won stage 3 of the race in a reduced sprint, and once again had a memorable post race interview. During the course of the interview she commented, through tears of joy, that the win was very satisfying considering the "fucking shit day" that she and her teammates had suffered the day before with crashes and bad luck. On stage 7, which was the first of back-to-back high mountain stages, she finished third. As a result, she rose in the overall standings to fifth.

Major results

2012
 UCI Junior Road World Championships
2nd  Time trial
8th Road race
2016
 1st  Time trial, National Road Championships
 1st  Overall Tour de Feminin-O cenu Českého Švýcarska
1st Stages 1 & 5
 1st  Mountains classification, Tour of Norway
 1st  Mountains classification, Gracia–Orlová
 5th KZN Summer Series Race 2
 7th 94.7 Cycle Challenge
 9th Road race, UEC European Road Championships
 9th Gooik–Geraardsbergen–Gooik
 10th Boels Rental Hills Classic
2017
 1st  Time trial, National Road Championships
 1st  Youth classification, UCI Women's World Tour
 1st  Overall Setmana Ciclista Valenciana
1st  Young rider classification
 1st  Young rider classification, Giro Rosa
 2nd Overall Giro della Toscana
1st  Young rider classification
 2nd  Time trial, UEC European Under-23 Championships
 2nd Crescent Vårgårda UCI Women's WorldTour TTT
 UCI Road World Championships
3rd  Team time trial
10th Time trial
 3rd Trofeo Alfredo Binda
 3rd La Classique Morbihan
 5th Grand Prix de Plumelec-Morbihan
 7th Overall Emakumeen XXX. Bira
 8th Overall The Women's Tour
 9th Strade Bianche
 10th Liège–Bastogne–Liège
2018
 1st  Time trial, National Road Championships
 3rd Crescent Vårgårda UCI Women's WorldTour TTT
 3rd Ladies Tour of Norway – TTT
 3rd Giro dell'Emilia
 4th Overall Setmana Ciclista Valenciana
 4th La Course by Le Tour de France
 4th Chrono des Nations
 6th Overall Giro Rosa
 7th Trofeo Alfredo Binda
 10th Strade Bianche
2019
 1st Grand Prix de Plumelec-Morbihan
 1st  Mountains classification, Tour of Scotland
 3rd Trofeo Alfredo Binda
 3rd Tour of Flanders
 3rd La Course by Le Tour de France
 4th Overall Tour de Bretagne
 5th Strade Bianche
 6th Amstel Gold Race
 8th La Flèche Wallonne
 10th Overall Setmana Ciclista Valenciana
 10th Liège–Bastogne–Liège
2020
 1st Giro dell'Emilia
 2nd La Flèche Wallonne
 3rd Road race, National Road Championships
 4th Overall Giro Rosa
1st  Mountains classification
 7th Strade Bianche
 8th Road race, UCI Road World Championships
2021
 2nd La Course by Le Tour de France
 3rd Trofeo Alfredo Binda
 5th Overall Tour of Norway
 5th Strade Bianche
 6th Overall Vuelta a Burgos
1st Stage 3
 7th Tour of Flanders
 7th Amstel Gold Race
 8th La Flèche Wallonne
 8th Liège–Bastogne–Liège
 8th Road race, UCI Road World Championships
2022
 1st  Road race, National Road Championships
 1st  Overall Tour of Scandinavia
1st Stage 5
 2nd Overall Setmana Ciclista Valenciana
 3th Durango-Durango Emakumeen Saria
 5th Overall Challenge by La Vuelta
 5th Overall Vuelta a Burgos
 5th Road race, UCI Road World Championships
 5th Strade Bianche
 6th Tour of Flanders
 6th Overall Giro d'Italia
 7th Overall Tour de France
1st Stage 3
 9th Trofeo Alfredo Binda
2023
 3rd Strade Bianche
 10th Overall Setmana Ciclista Valenciana

General classification results timeline

Classics results timeline

See also
 List of 2015 UCI Women's Teams and riders

References

External links

1995 births
Living people
Danish female cyclists
People from Frederiksberg Municipality
Olympic cyclists of Denmark
Cyclists at the 2020 Summer Olympics
Sportspeople from the Capital Region of Denmark
20th-century Danish women
21st-century Danish women